Kosmos 459 ( meaning Cosmos 459), also known as DS-P1-M No.5 was a satellite which was used as a target for tests of anti-satellite weapons. It was launched by the Soviet Union in 1971 as part of the Dnepropetrovsk Sputnik programme, and used as a target for Kosmos 462, as part of the Istrebitel Sputnikov programme.

Launch 
It was launched aboard a Kosmos-3M carrier rocket, from Site 132/1 at the Plesetsk Cosmodrome. The launch occurred at 17:30:00 UTC on 29 November 1971.

Orbit 
It was successfully intercepted and destroyed by Kosmos 462. Two major pieces of debris were associated with the satellite, which decayed from orbit on 1 and 7 December 1971.

Kosmos 459 was the fourth of the five original DS-P1-M satellites to be launched, of which all but the first successfully reached orbit. After the five initial launches the DS-P1-M satellite was replaced with a derivative, Lira. The interception of Kosmos 459 was the last completed test of the IS-A interceptor as part of Soviet state trials, and the last attempt to intercept a baseline DS-P1-M satellite as no attempt was made to intercept Kosmos 521. Following the test, the IS-A anti-satellite system was declared operational.

See also

 1971 in spaceflight

References

1971 in spaceflight
Intentionally destroyed artificial satellites
1971 in the Soviet Union
Satellites formerly orbiting Earth
Kosmos satellites
Spacecraft launched in 1971
Dnepropetrovsk Sputnik program